Michael Huang (born November 28, 1958) is a Taiwanese actor and singer.

Filmography

Television series

Film

Variety show

Theater

Discography

Studio albums

Published works

Awards and nominations

References

External links
 
 
 

1958 births
Living people
20th-century Taiwanese male actors
21st-century Taiwanese male actors
20th-century Taiwanese male singers
Taiwanese male film actors
Taiwanese male television actors
Taiwanese male stage actors
Taiwanese television presenters
Affiliated Senior High School of National Taiwan Normal University alumni
Shih Hsin University alumni